Pedro Ordóñez y Flórez (1560–1614) was a Roman Catholic prelate who served as Archbishop of Santafé en Nueva Granada (1610–1614).

Biography
Pedro Ordóñez y Flórez was born in Brozas, Spain in 1560. On 19 Apr 1610, he was appointed during the papacy of Pope Paul V as Archbishop of Santafé en Nueva Granada. On 21 Dec 1611, he was consecrated bishop by Bartolomé Lobo Guerrero, Archbishop of Lima. He served as Archbishop of Santafé en Nueva Granada until his death on 11 Jun 16149.

References

External links and additional sources
 (for Chronology of Bishops) 
 (for Chronology of Bishops) 

17th-century Roman Catholic bishops in New Granada
Bishops appointed by Pope Paul V
1560 births
1614 deaths
Spanish Roman Catholic bishops in South America
Roman Catholic archbishops of Bogotá